The 2007–08 SIJHL season is the 7th season of the Superior International Junior Hockey League (SIJHL). The seven teams of the SIJHL will play 50-game schedules.

Come February, the top teams of the league will play down for the Bill Salonen Cup, the SIJHL championship.  The winner of the Bill Salonen Cup will compete in the Central Canadian Junior "A" championship, the Dudley Hewitt Cup.  If successful against the winners of the Ontario Junior Hockey League and Northern Ontario Junior Hockey League, the champion would then move on to play in the Canadian Junior Hockey League championship, the 2008 Royal Bank Cup.

Changes 
Fort Frances Jr. Sabres join league.
Marathon Renegades fold mid-season (February).

Final standings
Note: GP = Games played; W = Wins; L = Losses; OTL = Overtime losses; SL = Shootout losses; GF = Goals for; GA = Goals against; PTS = Points; x = clinched playoff berth; y = clinched division title; z = clinched conference title

Teams listed on the official league website.

Standings listed on official league website.

2007-08 Bill Salonen Cup Playoffs

Playoff results are listed on the official league website.

Dudley Hewitt Cup Championship
Hosted by the Newmarket Hurricanes in Newmarket, Ontario.  Dryden finished in third place.

Round Robin
Oakville Blades (OPJHL) 5 - Dryden Ice Dogs 1
Newmarket Hurricanes (OPJHL) 7 - Dryden Ice Dogs 1
Dryden Ice Dogs 4 - Sudbury Jr. Wolves (NOJHL) 0

Semi-final
Newmarket Hurricanes (OPJHL) 2 - Dryden Ice Dogs 1

Scoring leaders 
Note: GP = Games played; G = Goals; A = Assists; Pts = Points; PIM = Penalty minutes

Leading goaltenders 
Note: GP = Games played; Mins = Minutes played; W = Wins; L = Losses: OTL = Overtime losses; SL = Shootout losses; GA = Goals Allowed; SO = Shutouts; GAA = Goals against average

Awards
Most Valuable Player - Quinn Amiel (Fort Frances Jr. Sabres)
Most Improved Player -
Rookie of the Year - Mitch Cain (Fort Frances Jr. Sabres)
Top Defenceman - Brad Pawlowski (Thunder Bay Bearcats)
Top Defensive Forward -
Most Gentlemanly Player -
Top Goaltender - Drew Strandberg (Thunder Bay Bearcats)
Coach of the Year - Wayne Strachan (Fort Frances Jr. Sabres)
Top Scorer Award -
Top Executive - Carolyn Kellaway, Nancy Gradiman (Fort Frances Jr. Sabres)

See also 
 2008 Royal Bank Cup
 Dudley Hewitt Cup

References

External links 
 Official website of the Superior International Junior Hockey League
 Official website of the Canadian Junior Hockey League

Superior International Junior Hockey League seasons
SIJHL